Duo is an unincorporated community and coal town in Greenbrier County, West Virginia, United States.

The community was so named on account of there being only two houses standing at the town site.

References

Unincorporated communities in Greenbrier County, West Virginia
Unincorporated communities in West Virginia
Coal towns in West Virginia